Purrel Fränkel (born 8 October 1976) is a Dutch former professional footballer. He played 474 matches in professional football for Telstar, De Graafschap and Vitesse.

Club career
Fränkel is a defender who was born in Paramaribo and made his debut in professional football, being part of the Telstar squad in the 1994–95 season. He also played for De Graafschap before joining Vitesse.

In 2003, he scored an own goal against FC Twente when the match was just 19 seconds old. This was an all-time record in the Eredivisie, but it was broken three years later by Arnold Kruiswijk of FC Groningen, who, in a match against Heracles Almelo, managed to pass his own goalkeeper after 9 seconds.

In March 2009 he was suspended for a month by the Royal Dutch Football Association (KNVB) after testing positive on smoking cannabis.

After the relegation of De Graafschap in 2012, Fränkel decided he did not want to play in the Eerste Divisie any more and retired from professional football. He since played several years at amateur level for VV DUNO, and also worked as assistant coach during the 2018–19 season. During his time at DUNO, he helped lead the club from the ninth-tier Vierde Klasse to the fifth-tier Hoofdklasse.

Honours
De Graafschap
 Eerste Divisie: 2009–10

DUNO
 Vierde Klasse: 2013
 Derde Klasse: 2014
 Tweede Klasse: 2016
 Eerste Klasse: 2018

References

External links
 Player profile - De Graafschap
 Dutch league stats - Voetbal International 

1976 births
Living people
Sportspeople from Paramaribo
Association football fullbacks
Dutch footballers
Surinamese emigrants to the Netherlands
Eredivisie players
Eerste Divisie players
SC Telstar players
De Graafschap players
SBV Vitesse players
VV DUNO players
Eerste Klasse players
Vierde Divisie players